Stephanie Mavunga is an American professional basketball player who is currently a free agent. She was drafted by Indiana in the second round and 14th overall pick of the 2018 draft, becoming the first Zimbabwean-born player to be drafted by the WNBA.

College career
Mavunga began her college career at North Carolina.  In her rookie season, she made 34 starts and played in 37 games for the Tar Heels.  She averaged 10.7 points and a team-leading 8.2 rebounds and 2.4 blocks per game.  In her sophomore season, she was named First Team All-ACC and to the Preseason All-ACC team.  Despite ranking 2nd in the ACC in double doubles that season, she decided to transfer to Ohio State.  Mavunga sat out the 2015-16 season under NCAA Transfer rules.  In her junior season, she made 22 appearances for the Buckeyes, and averaged 11.4 points per game and 10.8 rebounds per game.  She became the third player in Ohio State history to average a double double.  Her senior season was another success, as she was named to the All-Big Ten team and the All-Big Ten Tournament team.

North Carolina and Ohio State statistics

Source

WNBA career
Mavunga was drafted 14th overall in the 2018 WNBA Draft by the Indiana Fever.  She played in 25 games for the Fever, averaging 2.2 points per game and 2.2 rebounds per game over the season.  She did not start any games during the 2018 season.

On August 28, 2020, Mavunga was traded to the Chicago Sky for Jantel Lavender as well as second and third round draft picks in the 2021 WNBA Draft.

WNBA career statistics

Regular season

|-
| align="left" | 2018
| align="left" | Indiana
| 25 || 0 || 7.8 || .477 || .000 || .800 || 2.2 || 0.2 || 0.3 || 0.2 || 0.4 || 2.2
|-
| align="left" | 2019
| align="left" | Indiana
| 24 || 0 || 8.5 || .511 || .000 || .706 || 2.3 || 0.2 || 0.3 || 0.3 || 0.4 || 2.5
|-
| align="left" | 2020
| align="left" | Indiana
| 5 || 0 || 11.8 || .444 || .000 || .818 || 4.0 || 0.6 || 0.0 || 0.4 || 1.0 || 5.0
|-
| align="left" | 2020
| align="left" | Chicago
| 5 || 0 || 7.2 || .455 || .000 || .000 || 2.6 || 0.4 || 0.2 || 0.0 || 1.2 || 2.0
|-
| align="left" | Career
| align="left" | 3 years, 2 teams
| 59 || 0 || 8.4 || .483 || .000 || .767 || 2.5 || 0.2 || 0.3 || 0.3 || 0.5 || 2.5

Playoffs

|-
| align="left" | 2020
| align="left" | Chicago
| 1 || 0 || 1.0 || .000 || .000 || .000 || 0.0 || 0.0 || 0.0 || 0.0 || 1.0 || 0.0
|-
| align="left" | Career
| align="left" | 1 year, 1 team
| 1 || 0 || 1.0 || .000 || .000 || .000 || 0.0 || 0.0 || 0.0 || 0.0 || 1.0 || 0.0

References

External links
 WNBA Profile
 North Carolina Tar Heels bio
 Ohio State Buckeyes bio

1995 births
Living people
American women's basketball players
Basketball players at the 2015 Pan American Games
Basketball players from Indiana
Chicago Sky players
Indiana Fever draft picks
Indiana Fever players
McDonald's High School All-Americans
North Carolina Tar Heels women's basketball players
Ohio State Buckeyes women's basketball players
Pan American Games medalists in basketball
Pan American Games silver medalists for the United States
Parade High School All-Americans (girls' basketball)
People from Brownsburg, Indiana
Power forwards (basketball)
Sportspeople from Harare
Medalists at the 2015 Pan American Games
United States women's national basketball team players